USS A. Brook Taylor (SP-326) was the planned designation for a fishing vessel the United States Navy considered for use as a minesweeper during World War I but never acquired.

A. Brook Taylor was built as a wooden-hulled commercial fishing trawler in 1913. The anticipated "emergency" undoubtedly referred to extensive mining of American waters. However, even though German submarines did lay some mines off the United States East Coast, the Navy never took over A. Brook Taylor, and she remained in commercial service.

References
 
 
 NavSource Online: Section Patrol Craft Photo Archive A. Brook Taylor (SP 326)

Fishing ships of the United States
Cancelled ships of the United States Navy
1913 ships